In mathematical optimization, the push–relabel algorithm (alternatively, preflow–push algorithm) is an algorithm for computing maximum flows in a flow network. The name "push–relabel" comes from the two basic operations used in the algorithm. Throughout its execution, the algorithm maintains a "preflow" and gradually converts it into a maximum flow by moving flow locally between neighboring nodes using push operations under the guidance of an admissible network maintained by relabel operations. In comparison, the Ford–Fulkerson algorithm performs global augmentations that send flow following paths from the source all the way to the sink.

The push–relabel algorithm is considered one of the most efficient maximum flow algorithms. The generic algorithm has a strongly polynomial  time complexity, which is asymptotically more efficient than the  Edmonds–Karp algorithm. Specific variants of the algorithms achieve even lower time complexities. The variant based on the highest label node selection rule has  time complexity and is generally regarded as the benchmark for maximum flow algorithms. Subcubic  time complexity can be achieved using dynamic trees, although in practice it is less efficient.

The push–relabel algorithm has been extended to compute minimum cost flows. The idea of distance labels has led to a more efficient augmenting path algorithm, which in turn can be incorporated back into the push–relabel algorithm to create a variant with even higher empirical performance.

History

The concept of a preflow was originally designed by Alexander V. Karzanov and was published in 1974 in Soviet Mathematical Dokladi 15. This pre-flow algorithm also used a push operation; however, it used distances in the auxiliary network to determine where to push the flow instead of a labeling system.

The push-relabel algorithm was designed by Andrew V. Goldberg and Robert Tarjan. The algorithm was initially presented in November 1986 in STOC '86: Proceedings of the eighteenth annual ACM symposium on Theory of computing, and then officially in October 1988 as an article in the Journal of the ACM. Both papers detail a generic form of the algorithm terminating in  along with a  sequential implementation, a  implementation using dynamic trees, and parallel/distributed implementation. A explained in  Goldberg-Tarjan introduced distance labels by incorporating them into the parallel maximum flow algorithm of Yossi Shiloach and Uzi Vishkin.

Concepts

Definitions and notations

Let:
 be a network with capacity function ,
 being the edges where ,
and

The push–relabel algorithm uses a nonnegative integer valid labeling function which makes use of distance labels, or heights, on nodes to determine which arcs should be selected for the push operation. This function must satisfy the following conditions in order to be considered valid:

Valid labeling:
 for all 
Source condition:

Sink conservation:

An arc   is called admissible if . The admissible network  is composed of the set of arcs    that are admissible. The admissible network is acyclic.

Operations

Initialization

The algorithm starts by creating a residual graph, initializing the preflow values to zero and performing a set of saturating push operations on residual arcs exiting the source, . Similarly, the labels are initialized such that the label at the source is the number of nodes in the graph, and all other nodes are given a label of zero. Once the initialization is complete the algorithm repeatedly performs either the push or relabel operations against active nodes until no applicable operation can be performed.

Push

 push(u, v):
     assert xf[u] > 0 and 𝓁[u] == 𝓁[v] + 1
     Δ = min(xf[u], c[u][v] - f[u][v])
     f[u][v] += Δ
     f[v][u] -= Δ
     xf[u] -= Δ
     xf[v] += Δ

A push operation that causes  to reach  is called a saturating push since it uses up all the available capacity of the residual arc. Otherwise, all of the excess at the node is pushed across the residual arc. This is called an unsaturating or non-saturating push.

Relabel
It modifies  to be the minimum value such that an admissible out-arc is created.

 relabel(u):
     assert xf[u] > 0 and 𝓁[u] <= 𝓁[v] for all v such that cf[u][v] > 0
     𝓁[u] = 1 + min(𝓁[v] for all v such that cf[u][v] > 0)

Effects of push and relabel

The generic push–relabel algorithm

The generic push–relabel algorithm is used as a proof of concept only and does not contain implementation details on how to select an active node for the push and relabel operations.

After initialisation, the algorithm repeatedly executes an applicable push or relabel operation until no such operations apply, at which point the pre-flow has been converted into a maximum flow.

 generic-push-relabel(G, c, s, t):
     create a pre-flow f that saturates all out-arcs of s
     let 𝓁[s] = |V|
     let 𝓁[v] = 0 for all v ∈ V \ {s}
     while there is an applicable push or relabel operation do
         execute the operation

Correctness
The algorithm maintains the condition that  is a valid labeling during its execution. This can be proven true by examining the effects of the push and relabel operations on the label function . The relabel operation increases the label value by the associated minimum plus one which will always satisfy the  constraint.

This can be proven by contradiction based on inequalities which arise in the labeling function when supposing that an augmenting path does exist. This means all  have no excess flow, and with no excess the preflow  obeys the flow conservation constraint and can be considered a normal flow.

Therefore, the algorithm will return the maximum flow upon termination.

Time complexity
In order to bound the time complexity of the algorithm, we must analyze the number of push and relabel operations which occur within the main loop. The numbers of relabel, saturating push and nonsaturating push operations are analyzed separately.

In the algorithm, the relabel operation can be performed at most  times. This is because the labeling  value for any node u can never decrease, and the maximum label value is at most  for all nodes. This means the relabel operation could potentially be performed  times for all nodes  (i.e.  ).

For the arc to be reinserted into  for another saturating push,  must first be relabeled, followed by a push on the arc , then  must be relabeled. In the process,  increases by at least two.

Bounding the number of nonsaturating pushes can be achieved via a potential argument. We use the potential function  (i.e.  is the sum of the labels of all active nodes). It is obvious that  is  initially and stays nonnegative throughout the execution of the algorithm. Both relabels and saturating pushes can increase . However, the value of  must be equal to 0 at termination since there cannot be any remaining active nodes at the end of the algorithm's execution.
The relabel operation can increase  by at most . A saturating push on  activates  if it was inactive before the push, increasing  by at most . A nonsaturating push on  always deactivates , but it can also activate  as in a saturating push. As a result, it decreases  by at least .

In sum, the algorithm executes  relabels,  saturating pushes and  nonsaturating pushes. Data structures can be designed to pick and execute an applicable operation in  time.

Example
The following is a sample execution of the generic push-relabel algorithm, as defined above, on the following simple network flow graph diagram.

 
Each residual graph in the example only contains the residual arcs with a capacity larger than zero. Each residual graph may contain multiple iterations of the  loop.
 

The example (but with initial flow of 0) can be run here interactively.

Practical implementations
While the generic push–relabel algorithm has  time complexity, efficient implementations achieve  or lower time complexity by enforcing appropriate rules in selecting applicable push and relabel operations. The empirical performance can be further improved by heuristics.

"Current-arc" data structure and discharge operation
The "current-arc" data structure is a mechanism for visiting the in- and out-neighbors of a node in the flow network in a static circular order. If a singly linked list of neighbors is created for a node, the data structure can be as simple as a pointer into the list that steps through the list and rewinds to the head when it runs off the end.

Based on the "current-arc" data structure, the discharge operation can be defined. A discharge operation applies on an active node and repeatedly pushes flow from the node until it becomes inactive, relabeling it as necessary to create admissible arcs in the process.

 discharge(u):
     while xf[u] > 0 do
         if current-arc[u] has run off the end of neighbors[u] then
             relabel(u)
             rewind current-arc[u]
         else
             let (u, v) = current-arc[u]
             if (u, v) is admissible then
                 push(u, v)
             let current-arc[u] point to the next neighbor of u
Finding the next admissible edge to push on has  amortized complexity. The current-arc pointer only moves to the next neighbor when the edge to the current neighbor is saturated or non-admissible, and neither of these two properties can change until the active node  is relabelled. Therefore, when the pointer runs off, there are no admissible unsaturated edges and we have to relabel the active node , so having moved the pointer  times is paid for by the  relabel operation.

Active node selection rules
Definition of the discharge operation reduces the push–relabel algorithm to repeatedly selecting an active node to discharge. Depending on the selection rule, the algorithm exhibits different time complexities. For the sake of brevity, we ignore  and  when referring to the nodes in the following discussion.

FIFO selection rule
The FIFO push–relabel algorithm organizes the active nodes into a queue. The initial active nodes can be inserted in arbitrary order. The algorithm always removes the node at the front of the queue for discharging. Whenever an inactive node becomes active, it is appended to the back of the queue.

The algorithm has  time complexity.

Relabel-to-front selection rule
The relabel-to-front push–relabel algorithm organizes all nodes into a linked list and maintains the invariant that the list is topologically sorted with respect to the admissible network. The algorithm scans the list from front to back and performs a discharge operation on the current node if it is active. If the node is relabeled, it is moved to the front of the list, and the scan is restarted from the front.

The algorithm also has  time complexity.

Highest label selection rule
The highest-label push–relabel algorithm organizes all nodes into buckets indexed by their labels. The algorithm always selects an active node with the largest label to discharge.

The algorithm has  time complexity. If the lowest-label selection rule is used instead, the time complexity becomes .

Implementation techniques

The algorithm is typically separated into two phases. Phase one computes a maximum pre-flow by discharging only active nodes whose labels are below . It can be shown that phase two has  time complexity regardless of the order of push and relabel operations and is therefore dominated by phase one. Alternatively, it can be implemented using flow decomposition.

Heuristics are crucial to improving the empirical performance of the algorithm. Two commonly used heuristics are the gap heuristic and the global relabeling heuristic. The gap heuristic detects gaps in the labeling function. Both heuristics skip unhelpful relabel operations, which are a bottleneck of the algorithm and contribute to the ineffectiveness of dynamic trees.

Sample implementations

#include <stdlib.h>
#include <stdio.h>

#define NODES 6
#define MIN(X,Y) ((X) < (Y) ? (X) : (Y))
#define INFINITE 10000000

void push(const int * const * C, int ** F, int *excess, int u, int v) {
  int send = MIN(excess[u], C[u][v] - F[u][v]);
  F[u][v] += send;
  F[v][u] -= send;
  excess[u] -= send;
  excess[v] += send;
}

void relabel(const int * const * C, const int * const * F, int *height, int u) {
  int v;
  int min_height = INFINITE;
  for (v = 0; v < NODES; v++) {
    if (C[u][v] - F[u][v] > 0) {
      min_height = MIN(min_height, height[v]);
      height[u] = min_height + 1;
    }
  }
};

void discharge(const int * const * C, int ** F, int *excess, int *height, int *seen, int u) {
  while (excess[u] > 0) {
    if (seen[u] < NODES) {
      int v = seen[u];
      if ((C[u][v] - F[u][v] > 0) && (height[u] > height[v])) {
        push(C, F, excess, u, v);
      } else {
        seen[u] += 1;
      }
    } else {
      relabel(C, F, height, u);
      seen[u] = 0;
    }
  }
}

void moveToFront(int i, int *A) {
  int temp = A[i];
  int n;
  for (n = i; n > 0; n--) {
    A[n] = A[n-1];
  }
  A[0] = temp;
}

int pushRelabel(const int * const * C, int ** F, int source, int sink) {
  int *excess, *height, *list, *seen, i, p;

  excess = (int *) calloc(NODES, sizeof(int));
  height = (int *) calloc(NODES, sizeof(int));
  seen = (int *) calloc(NODES, sizeof(int));

  list = (int *) calloc((NODES-2), sizeof(int));

  for (i = 0, p = 0; i < NODES; i++){
    if ((i != source) && (i != sink)) {
      list[p] = i;
      p++;
    }
  }

  height[source] = NODES;
  excess[source] = INFINITE;
  for (i = 0; i < NODES; i++)
    push(C, F, excess, source, i);

  p = 0;
  while (p < NODES - 2) {
    int u = list[p];
    int old_height = height[u];
    discharge(C, F, excess, height, seen, u);
    if (height[u] > old_height) {
      moveToFront(p, list);
      p = 0;
    } else {
      p += 1;
    }
  }
  int maxflow = 0;
  for (i = 0; i < NODES; i++)
    maxflow += F[source][i];

  free(list);

  free(seen);
  free(height);
  free(excess);

  return maxflow;
}

void printMatrix(const int * const * M) {
  int i, j;
  for (i = 0; i < NODES; i++) {
    for (j = 0; j < NODES; j++)
      printf("%d\t",M[i][j]);
    printf("\n");
  }
}

int main(void) {
  int **flow, **capacities, i;
  flow = (int **) calloc(NODES, sizeof(int*));
  capacities = (int **) calloc(NODES, sizeof(int*));
  for (i = 0; i < NODES; i++) {
    flow[i] = (int *) calloc(NODES, sizeof(int));
    capacities[i] = (int *) calloc(NODES, sizeof(int));
  }

  // Sample graph
  capacities[0][1] = 2;
  capacities[0][2] = 9;
  capacities[1][2] = 1;
  capacities[1][3] = 0;
  capacities[1][4] = 0;
  capacities[2][4] = 7;
  capacities[3][5] = 7;
  capacities[4][5] = 4;

  printf("Capacity:\n");
  printMatrix(capacities);

  printf("Max Flow:\n%d\n", pushRelabel(capacities, flow, 0, 5));

  printf("Flows:\n");
  printMatrix(flow);

  return 0;
}

def relabel_to_front(C, source: int, sink: int) -> int:
    n = len(C)  # C is the capacity matrix
    F = [[0] * n for _ in range(n)]
    # residual capacity from u to v is C[u][v] - F[u][v]

    height = [0] * n  # height of node
    excess = [0] * n  # flow into node minus flow from node
    seen   = [0] * n  # neighbours seen since last relabel
    # node "queue"
    nodelist = [i for i in range(n) if i != source and i != sink]

    def push(u, v):
        send = min(excess[u], C[u][v] - F[u][v])
        F[u][v] += send
        F[v][u] -= send
        excess[u] -= send
        excess[v] += send

    def relabel(u):
        # Find smallest new height making a push possible,
        # if such a push is possible at all.
        min_height = ∞
        for v in xrange(n):
            if C[u][v] - F[u][v] > 0:
                min_height = min(min_height, height[v])
                height[u] = min_height + 1

    def discharge(u):
        while excess[u] > 0:
            if seen[u] < n:  # check next neighbour
                v = seen[u]
                if C[u][v] - F[u][v] > 0 and height[u] > height[v]:
                    push(u, v)
                else:
                    seen[u] += 1
            else:  # we have checked all neighbours. must relabel
                relabel(u)
                seen[u] = 0

    height[source] = n  # longest path from source to sink is less than n long
    excess[source] = ∞  # send as much flow as possible to neighbours of source
    for v in range(n):
        push(source, v)

    p = 0
    while p < len(nodelist):
        u = nodelist[p]
        old_height = height[u]
        discharge(u)
        if height[u] > old_height:
            nodelist.insert(0, nodelist.pop(p))  # move to front of list
            p = 0  # start from front of list
        else:
            p += 1

    return sum(F[source])

References 

Network flow problem
Graph algorithms